Siteki Airfield  is an airstrip serving Siteki, a town in the Lubombo Region of Eswatini.

There are wooded ravines east and south of the runway.

See also
List of airports in Eswatini
Transport in Eswatini

References

External links
OpenStreetMap - Siteki Airfield
 OurAirports - Siteki
 FallingRain - Siteki

 Google Earth

Airports in Eswatini